Stara Łupianka  is a village in the administrative district of Gmina Łapy, within Białystok County, Podlaskie Voivodeship, in north-eastern Poland.

The village has a population of 406 and covers 1,174 hectares.

On 1 August 1944, the village was pacified by the Germans. The Germans murdered 15 men and 2 women. The very executions were in retaliation for the village's help rendered to the local Polish partisans.

The last Sunday of May, every year, the entire village celebrates a Family Fest.

References

Villages in Białystok County